Carole Bouquet (born 18 August 1957) is a French actress who has appeared in more than 60 films since 1977.  In 1990, she was awarded the César Award for Best Actress for her role in Too Beautiful for You. She was the face of Chanel No. 5 fragrance from 1986 to 1997.

Life and career 
Bouquet was born in Neuilly-sur-Seine.

She was recognized for her work in Luis Buñuel's surrealist classic That Obscure Object of Desire (1977), and in the internationally successful film Too Beautiful For You (1989), for which she won the César Award for Best Actress. Also she received a César Award nomination for Best Supporting Actress in Rive droite, rive gauche (1984).

Bouquet is best known for her role as Bond girl Melina Havelock opposite Roger Moore in the 1981 James Bond film For Your Eyes Only, and as a model for French luxury fashion label Chanel in the 1980s being the face of Chanel No. 5. She was the companion of producer Jean-Pierre Rassam with whom she had a son, Dimitri Rassam, also a producer. In 1987, she gave birth to a son, Louis, with photographer Francis Giacobetti. She married immunologist Jacques Leibowitch in 1992; they divorced in 1996.

In 1999, she was a member of the jury of the 4th Shanghai International Film Festival.

She was a member of the main competition jury of the Cannes Film Festival in 2014.

On 21 May 2014, Bouquet formalized her relationship with Philippe Sereys de Rothschild on the red carpet of the 37th Festival de Cannes, of which she was one of the members of the jury.

She has been running a winery, Maison Carole Bouquet, on the island of Pantelleria in the Strait of Sicily since 2005.

Filmography

Theatre

See also 
List of celebrities who own wineries and vineyards

References

External links 

 
 
 
 

1957 births
Living people
People from Neuilly-sur-Seine
French film actresses
French female models
20th-century French actresses
21st-century French actresses
French National Academy of Dramatic Arts alumni
French television actresses
French stage actresses
Commandeurs of the Ordre des Arts et des Lettres
Best Actress César Award winners